Bonhote or Bonhôte is a surname and can refer to:

People
 , peerage person
 Elizabeth Bonhôte (1744–1818), English novelist, essayist, and poet
  (1857-1924), Swiss politician
 , film producer, director, and screenwriter
  (b. 1982), British peer
  (1832-1892)
  (1903-1973), author and publisher
 J. Lewis Bonhote (1875–1922), English zoologist, ornithologist, and writer
 Julian David Bonhote Wilson (1940–2014), BBC Television horse racing correspondent
 , peerage person
  (1965-2016), Swiss politician
 Thomas Bonhôte Henderson (1875–1920), English first-class cricketer and surgeon
 Walter Edward Bonhote Henderson (1880–1944), British track and field athlete

Other
 Banque Bonhôte, Swiss private bank founded in 1815 in Neuchâtel